Peter Hardie (1921 – 5 May 1960) was a British water polo player. He competed in the men's tournament at the 1948 Summer Olympics.

References

1921 births
1960 deaths
British male water polo players
Olympic water polo players of Great Britain
Water polo players at the 1948 Summer Olympics